There are two species of lizard named stout barsided skink:
 Concinnia frerei
 Concinnia sokosoma